Henry Howorth may refer to:

Henry Howorth (barrister) (c.1746–1783), British King's Counsel and Member of Parliament for Abingdon
Henry Howorth (New Zealand politician) (1834–1907), New Zealand solicitor and Member of Parliament
Henry Hoyle Howorth (1842–1923), British barrister, Member of Parliament and historian